Edward James Clarke Garden (1930 – 23 September 2017), commonly known as Teddy Garden, was a British musicologist and academic. In 1969, he received a PhD from the University of Edinburgh for his thesis on "Mily Alexeyevich Balakirev". He was James Rossiter Hoyle Professor of Music (and Head of the Department of Music) at the University of Sheffield between 1975 and 1993. He was part of the music staff at Clifton College between 1954 and 1957, and then director of music at Loretto School until 1966, when he was appointed senior lecturer in music at the University of Glasgow. His time at Sheffield was marked by the university's difficulties in the early 1980s, but Garden went on to oversee a period of expansion in terms of student numbers and staff, and the introduction of new PhD programmes and concerts. In retirement, he was an emeritus professor at Sheffield.

Selected publications 
Balakirev: A Critical Study of his Life and Music (Faber, 1967).
Tchaikovsky (Dent, 1973).

References 

 

 
 
 

1930 births
2017 deaths
British musicologists
Academics of the University of Glasgow
Academics of the University of Sheffield